"Worry About You" is a song by British singer-songwriter Tyler James featuring vocals from English rapper Kano. The track was released as the second single from James' second studio album A Place I Go and peaked at number 38 on the UK Singles Chart.

Music video
A music video to accompany the release of "Worry About You" was first released onto YouTube on 1 January 2013.

Track listings

Chart performance

Release history

References

2012 songs
2013 singles
Tyler James (English musician) songs
Kano (rapper) songs
Island Records singles
Songs written by Blair MacKichan